Daniel Kofi Agyei (born 1 January 1992) is a Ghanaian professional footballer who plays for Italian club Casale as a midfielder.

Career
Agyei made his Serie A debut for Fiorentina on 16 May 2010 in a match against Bari when he came on as a substitute in the 48th minute for Marco Donadel.

On 4 July 2012, he moved to S.S. Juve Stabia on loan 

On 2 September 2013, Benevento buy the Co-ownership from Fiorentina.
On 17 June 2014 remain in co-ownership to Benevento for another year.

On 25 June 2015, Benevento buy all part of the player.

On 22 October 2021, he signed with the Serie D club Casale.

Career statistics

References

External links
 
 

Living people
1992 births
Footballers from Accra
Association football midfielders
Ghanaian footballers
Ghanaian expatriate footballers
Expatriate footballers in Italy
ACF Fiorentina players
S.S. Juve Stabia players
Benevento Calcio players
Casertana F.C. players
U.S. Ancona 1905 players
Carrarese Calcio players
Casale F.B.C. players
Serie A players
Serie B players
Serie C players